Moncena Dunn may refer to:

 Moncena Dunn (inventor), 1867–1944, inventor of the fraud-proof ballot
 Moncena Dunn (soldier), 1823–1895